Walter H. F. Smith is a geophysicist, currently working in NOAA's Laboratory for Satellite Altimetry. He was formerly Chair of the scientific and technical sub-committee of GEBCO from 2003 to 2013.

Smith earned a BSc at the University of Southern California, and an MA, MPhil and PhD degrees at Columbia University. He was a post-doctoral fellow at the Institute for Geophysics and Planetary Physics of the Scripps Institution of Oceanography until joining NOAA in 1992.  Smith is a fellow of the American Geophysical Union, nominated for his contributions to marine geodesy.

Along with Pål Wessel, Smith created the Generic Mapping Tools, an open-source collection of computer software tools for processing and displaying geographic and Cartesian datasets.  Smith and Wessel developed and maintain the Global Self-consistent, Hierarchical, High-resolution Geography Database.

Selected research

References

Geophysicists
Scripps Institution of Oceanography faculty
University of Southern California alumni
Columbia University alumni
Living people
Year of birth missing (living people)